Stantec Inc. is an international professional services company in the design and consulting industry. The company was founded in 1954, as D. R. Stanley Associates in Edmonton, Alberta, Canada. Stantec provides professional consulting services in planning, engineering, architecture, interior design, landscape architecture, surveying, environmental sciences, project management, and project economics for infrastructure and facilities projects. The company provides services on projects around the world, with over 26,000 employees operating out of more than 400 locations in North America and across offices on six continents.

History
Don Stanley was the first Canadian to earn a Ph.D. in environmental engineering. Attending Harvard University on a Rockefeller Foundation scholarship, he earned his doctorate in 1952 and two years later founded D.R. Stanley & Associates, working as the sole proprietor out of a  office in Edmonton, Alberta. In 1955, Stanley hired a retired railway engineer, Herb Roblin, and a former chief bridge engineer for the provincial government, Louis Grimble. The firm was renamed Stanley, Grimble and Roblin Ltd. and with the two new partners’ transportation backgrounds, the firm diversified quickly.

The 1970s were boom years for Stanley Associates, but with the advance of the sharp recession of the 1980s, Stanley was ready to turn the company over to his second-in-command, Ron Triffo, in 1983. Triffo held a bachelor's degree in civil engineering from the University of Manitoba and an MSc in Engineering from the University of Illinois. In 1983, when Alberta's economy was struggling in response to the Canadian government's National Energy Program, Triffo became president and COO, while Stanley retained his role as CEO and chair. “We had cut our staff in half from 400 to about 200,” Triffo said. “We really started to think about a new way of doing things for the company. We were heavily involved in Alberta in a big, big way and therefore very vulnerable to the up and down cycles of the province. We decided we had to diversify the company in a discipline sense. We had to become more than just a civil engineering company and we had to diversify geographically.”

The company started its diversification by forming an urban development company under another name, IMC, which grew to 200 people. The diversification of Stanley Associates occurred by acquisition as well. The firm expanded into British Columbia and Saskatchewan and internationally, beginning a corporate move into central Canada. Stanley also made its first U.S. acquisition, in Phoenix, establishing a base for specialty services and future expansion in the US Southwest.

Following the success of IMC, Stanley Associates' various practices operated under boutique names, with as many as 20 different companies. By the early 1990s, the companies were placed under the umbrella of Stanley Technology Group, and most subsidiaries featured the name Stanley in their name. Staff numbers neared 900 and the firm went public on the Toronto Stock Exchange in 1994.

In 1998, Triffo stepped into the role of board chair, where he remained until retiring in 2011. Tony Franceschini, then vice president of the Commercial/Institutional sector and a board member, became president and CEO. Franceschini began his career with a consulting engineering firm in Toronto, Ontario in 1975 after graduating from the University of Waterloo with a degree in civil engineering, where he worked with Triffo.

The year Franceschini became president and CEO, Stantec had 2,000 employees in 40 offices and reported $185.5 million in gross revenue. “Our vision is to grow the company into a 10,000 employee, billion-dollar firm by 2008,” Franceschini said. Franceschini was instrumental in launching the new global, single-brand identity, Stantec, which enabled the company's services to be delivered through an integrated approach. “The move was a major achievement –– in a two-month period, we sought and received shareholder approval to change the name of over 30 companies,” says Franceschini.

Stantec was listed on the New York Stock Exchange in 2005. Franceschini retired in May 2009. Bob Gomes was appointed president and CEO. Like the Stantec's previous three presidents, Gomes is a licensed engineer who earned his degree in civil engineering from the University of Alberta and joined Stantec in 1988.

Between 2008 and 2011, gross revenue increased from $1.4 billion to $1.7 billion, the Stantec team grew from 8,000 staff to over 12,000 staff, the company acquired 16 firms, and strengthened its presence in markets across North America and internationally. According to Reuters, US Edition, "Its services are offered through more than 170 locations in North America and four locations internationally"

In May 2016, Stantec signed a definitive merger agreement with MWH Global, Inc. worth $1.04 billion CAD, making Stantec Inc. one of the world's top three global design firms. It expected to boost revenues by 60% a year, and increased the number of employees from 15,000 to 22,000.

Bob Gomes retired from Stantec in 2017 and is a current member of the board of directors. In January 2018, Gord Johnston became CEO of Stantec. Johnston has 30 years of private and public sector experience in the design and project management of infrastructure projects. Johnston has bachelor of science and master of engineering degrees in civil engineering from the University of Alberta, and is a registered professional engineer, certified project management professional, and Envision Sustainability Professional.

Growth
Stantec has 26,000 employees and 400 locations on six continents worldwide.

Acquisitions
Stantec has acquired over 130 firms since 1994. Some of the acquisitions include MWH Global, Inc.,  KBR, Inc. Infrastructure Americas Division, Dessau engineering, Fay, Spofford & Thorndike, Sparling., and Traffic Design Group.

Major projects
Panama Canal Expansion
Stantec Tower; 2014
Open Hearth Park; 2013
Telus Spark; 2011
Blatchford Community; 2010
Anthony Henday Drive Southeast; 2003-2007 
Keystone Pipeline & Keystone Expansion Project; 2005
The Apollo – Saturn V Visitor Center; 1961-1972

Headquarters

On July 17, 2013, Stantec announced that it was going to initiate a request for proposal (RFP) to consolidate its Edmonton headquarters and other Edmonton offices into a single building. On August 26, 2014 the company announced that it had signed a 15-year lease with Edmonton's Arena District Partnership, a joint venture between the Katz Group and WAM Developments.

Stantec Tower is located in Edmonton's new downtown Ice District, and is a 66-storey , mixed use skyscraper. It is the tallest building in Edmonton, and the tallest building in Western Canada and outside of Toronto.

See also
Lists of companies on the TSX
S&P/TSX 60

References

External links 
 
 Stantec Achieves International Certification of its Environmental Management System
 Stantec reports solid operational results for 2011 year-end
 Forbes Profile: Robert J. (Bob) Gomes
 "Don't Wait for the Bottom" - Alberta Venture

Companies listed on the New York Stock Exchange
Companies listed on the Toronto Stock Exchange
Companies based in Edmonton
Construction and civil engineering companies of Canada
Engineering companies of Canada
Architecture firms of Canada
Mining engineering companies
1954 establishments in Alberta
Construction and civil engineering companies established in 1954
Canadian companies established in 1954